Janov krik is a biographical novel by Slovenian author . It was first published in 1985.

Slovenian novels
1985 novels